Mikhail Nikolsky (born 1891, date of death unknown) was a Russian Empire long-distance runner. He competed in the men's 5000 metres at the 1912 Summer Olympics.

References

1891 births
Year of death missing
Athletes (track and field) at the 1912 Summer Olympics
Male long-distance runners from the Russian Empire
Olympic competitors for the Russian Empire
Place of birth missing